Löwenhielm is a surname. Notable people with the surname include: 

Augusta Löwenhielm (1754–1846), Swedish countess and courtier
Carl Löwenhielm (1772–1861), Swedish military officer, diplomat, and politician
Carl Gustaf Löwenhielm (1790–1858), Swedish diplomat and lieutenant general
Gustaf Löwenhielm (1771-1856), Swedish general and diplomat
Jacquette Löwenhielm (1797–1839), Swedish noble and lady-in-waiting
Michelle Löwenhielm (born 1995), Swedish ice hockey player